Rt. Rev. William Moses was the fourth  Bishop of Church of South India, Coimbatore Diocese (1987 - 2000) and The Moderator (1998 - 2000)  of the Church of South India.

Early life 
Rt. Rev. William Moses was born on 29th of July 1937 to Mr. William Kari and Mrs. Janaki William Kari as the first son among 10 siblings.

Notes

20th-century Anglican bishops in India
Indian bishops
Indian Christian religious leaders
Anglican bishops of Coimbatore
Moderators of the Church of South India